Still Breathing was an American Christian metal band, and they primarily played metalcore. They came from Vinita Oklahoma. Not to be confused with another band of the same name that is also from Oklahoma and has a lead singer with a similar first name. The band started making music in 2000, when their membership was vocalist, Dacey, guitarists, with her fellow members Bob Hensley, John Hensley and Michael Rame. Their first studio album, September, was released by Solid State Records, in 2002.

Background
Still Breathing was a Christian metal band, who comes from Oklahoma.

Music history
The band commenced as a musical entity in 2000 with their first release, September, a studio album that was released by Solid State Records on April 23, 2002. They disbanded as a group in 2003.

Members
Last Known Line-up
 Dacey  - vocals
 Bob Hensley - guitar, backing vocals
 John Hensley - drums
 Michael Rame - bass

Former
 Art Sunday - bass

Discography
Studio albums
 September (April 23, 2002, Solid State)

References

External links
 Cross Rhythms artist profile

Musical groups from Oklahoma
2000 establishments in Oklahoma
2012 disestablishments in Oklahoma
Musical groups established in 2000
Musical groups disestablished in 2012
Solid State Records artists